Ratcliffe College is a coeducational Catholic private boarding and day school near the village of Ratcliffe on the Wreake, Leicestershire, approximately  from Leicester, England. In 1847, the buildings were converted for use as a boarding school for upper-class boys. The college became coeducational under the presidency of Father Tony Baxter in the mid-1970s. As of the 2018–2019 academic years, there were 850 students on roll at Ratcliffe, from ages 3 to 18.

The school buildings were designed by the Victorian Gothic revivalist Augustus Welby Pugin. Pugin, who is associated with Catholic architecture throughout the Midlands and north of England, is also noted for his collaboration with Charles Barry in the reconstruction of the Palace of Westminster. The Square was designed by Charles Francis Hansom, brother of Joseph Hansom, the designer of the Hansom cab. Various building works over the years have contributed to Pugin and Hansom's work, and modern buildings include a "new" gothic refectory (constructed in the early years of the twentieth century) and a Byzantine-style church.

Management
The school, operated by Rosmini's Institute of Charity, used to use the title "Father President" for the most senior member of staff who, up until 1996, was always a Father of the Institute. In 1996, the school appointed its first lay President, Tim Kilbride, and the position was renamed Headmaster. He was succeeded in 2000 by Peter Farrar and then in 2009 by Gareth Lloyd. Its current Headmaster is Mr Jonathan Reddin who took up the post in January 2017.

Former Presidents and Headmasters
 Father Peter Hutton IC 1851 – 1880

Independent Schools Inspectorate (ISI)
Ratcliffe College is regularly inspected by the Independent Schools Inspectorate (ISI). This is the body approved by the Department of Education for the purpose of inspecting schools belonging to Independent Schools Council (ISC) Associations and reporting on compliance with independent school regulations.

A team of ten inspectors from the Independent Schools Inspectorate spent four days examining every aspect of school life. You can download and read the complete report at: www.isi.net/schools/6822/.

The School received 'Excellent' report in all 9 categories:

 Pupils’ achievements and learning
 Curricular and extra-curricular provision
 Teaching
 Pupils’ spiritual, moral, social and cultural development
 Pastoral care
 Welfare, health and safety provision
 Boarding
 Governance
 Leadership and management, including links with parents

Partnership with Leicester City Football Club
In January 2015 Ratcliffe agreed a deal to educate 16 Thai students who had been selected by Leicester City FC to come to Leicester and who would benefit from regular exposure to the Academy facilities at Leicester City. Ratcliffe's Head of Boys' Boarding and former Director of Sport is ex-LCFC player, Phil Gilchrist

Cricket ground
The college cricket ground is used by the college cricket team.  The first recorded use of the ground came in 1948, when Ratcliffe College played King Edward's School, Birmingham.   The ground has also played host to a single List-A match, when the Leicestershire Cricket Board played Denmark in the 1st round of the 2003 Cheltenham & Gloucester Trophy which was played in 2002.

Alumni
Former pupils of Ratcliffe are known as Old Ratcliffians. They include:
 Terence Alexander, film and television actor, singer
 John Arnold, bishop
 Ian Bannen, noted Scottish actor and Oscar nominee for Best Supporting Actor (1965)
 Sir Peter Caruana, KCMG QC, former Chief Minister of Gibraltar
 Louis Deacon, England and Tigers rugby player
 Willie Doyle, Irish Jesuit Priest (killed in action during World War I)
 François Grosjean, psycholinguist and researcher on bilingualism
 Tim Knox, Director of the Royal Collection
 Joseph Lauwerys, prominent educationalist who helped to found UNESCO
 Patrick McGoohan, American-born actor of Irish parentage who rose to fame in the British film and TV industry: starring in the 1960s television series Danger Man and cult classic The Prisoner.
 Kevin Myers. 
 Patrick Nuttgens, noted architect, CBE
 Sir Gordon Reece, former advisor to Margaret Thatcher
 Michael Shipster, diplomat
 The Rt. Hon Lord St John of Fawsley, PC, former Conservative minister under Margaret Thatcher
 Richard Wallace, Editor of the Daily Mirror
 Tim Wilson, finalist of The Circle
 Luke Wright, Sussex CCC, and England cricketer.
 Martine Warmann, powerlifter

References

Bibliography
  Ratcliffe College 1847–1947 edited by Rev. C. R. Leetham with an Appendix at the back entitled 'Alphabetical List of Students 1847–1950'

External links
School Website
Profile on the ISC website

Private schools in Leicestershire
Member schools of the Headmasters' and Headmistresses' Conference
Educational institutions established in 1845
 
Cricket grounds in Leicestershire
1845 establishments in England
Roman Catholic private schools in the Diocese of Nottingham
Boarding schools in Leicestershire
Catholic boarding schools in England
Sports venues completed in 1948